Amphitryon is a 1935 German musical film. Written and directed by Reinhold Schünzel, it is based on plays by Molière, Plautus, and Heinrich von Kleist, which in turn are based on Greek mythology.

The film is known by a variety of other names: Amphitryon – Happiness from the Clouds, Amphitryon – Aus den Wolken kommt das Glück in Austria, Amfitryon in Greece, Anfitrione in Italy, Det gudomliga äventyret in Sweden.

Amphitryon was filmed in Ufa-Atelier, Neubabelsberg, from 2 February 1935 – May 1935. It was one of UFA's many multiple-language version films: a French version, Les dieux s'amusent (The gods are having fun), was shot at the same time.

Synopsis
Amphitryon is a Theban general away at war. The god Jupiter disguises himself as Amphitryon to seduce Amphitryon's wife, Alkmene.

Cast
Willy Fritsch as Jupiter / Amphitryon
Paul Kemp as Merkur / Sosias
Käthe Gold as Alkmene
Fita Benkhoff as Andria
Adele Sandrock as Juno
 Hilde Hildebrand as 1. Freundin Alkmenes
 Vilma Bekendorf as 2. Freundin Alkmenes
 Annie Ann as 3. Freundin Alkmenes
 Hilde Boenisch as 4. Freundin Alkmenes
 Ewald Wenck as Dr. Äskulap
 Aribert Wäscher as Thebener Kriegsminister
 Ellen-Ruth Knapp-Güttingen as 1. Thebener Ehefrau
 Annemarie Korff as 2. Thebener Ehefrau
 Liesl Otto as 3. Thebener Ehefrau
 Annemarie Schwindt as 4. Thebener Ehefrau
 Albert Karchow as Alter Grieche

Soundtrack
"Tausendmal war ich im Traum bei dir"

Lyrics by Charles Amberg (as C. Amberg)
Music by Franz Doelle
"Ich muß mal wieder was erleben"

Lyrics by Bruno Balz
Music by Franz Doelle

External links

Book references to Amphitryon
Amphitryon at allesfilm.com
Amphitryon at Fantastic Movie Musings & Ramblings
Amphitryon at zelluloid 
Amphitryon film clip from F.W. Murnau Stiftung (no subtitles)

1935 films
1930s musical fantasy films
1935 musical comedy films
German musical fantasy films
German musical comedy films
Films of Nazi Germany
1930s German-language films
Films directed by Reinhold Schünzel
Films based on works by Heinrich von Kleist
Films based on works by Molière
German films based on plays
Films based on ancient Greek plays
Films based on classical mythology
Films set in ancient Greece
Films about shapeshifting
1930s fantasy comedy films
German multilingual films
UFA GmbH films
German black-and-white films
German fantasy comedy films
Films shot at Babelsberg Studios
1935 multilingual films
Films based on works by Plautus
1930s German films